Dismas Nsengiyaremye (born 1945) served as Prime Minister of Rwanda from 2 April 1992 to 18 July 1993.

A native of Gitarama, he was a member of the Republican Democratic Movement and was appointed prime minister following an agreement between President Juvénal Habyarimana and the political opposition. During his term, he appointed Agathe Uwilingiyimana to the Ministry of Education, though she later succeeded him as prime minister.

When it was revealed in February 1993 that the army was compiling lists of alleged "accomplices" of the Rwandan Patriotic Front, Nsengiyaremye protested against what he called a "witch hunt". Nsengiyaremye fled to Europe not long after he was replaced as prime minister in 1993, citing threats to his life. He lives in exile in Belgium.

References

1945 births
Living people
Hutu people
Republican Democratic Movement politicians
Prime Ministers of Rwanda
People from Muhanga District